Oklahoma's 3rd congressional district is the largest congressional district in the state, covering an area of 34,088.49 square miles, over 48 percent the state's land mass. The district is bordered by New Mexico, Colorado, Kansas, and the Texas panhandle. Altogether, the district includes (in whole or in part) a total of 32 counties, and covers more territory than the state's other four districts combined. It is one of the largest districts in the nation that does not cover an entire state.

The district has been represented by Republican Frank Lucas since 2003. 

Prior to 2003, most of the territory now in the 3rd district was in the 6th district. Meanwhile, from 1915 to 2003, the 3rd district was located in southeastern Oklahoma, an area known as Little Dixie.  It had a dramatically different voting history from the current 3rd; only one Republican ever won it. It was the district of Carl Albert, Speaker of the House from 1971 to 1977.

Geography
The district borders New Mexico to the west, Colorado and Kansas to the north, and the Texas panhandle to the south. To the far west, the district includes the three counties of the Oklahoma Panhandle (Cimarron, Texas, Beaver), and also Harper, Ellis, Woodward, Woods, Major, Alfalfa, Grant, Garfield, Kay, Noble, Osage, Pawnee, Creek, Payne, Lincoln, Logan, Kingfisher, Blaine, Canadian, Dewey, Custer, Roger Mills, Beckham, Washita, Caddo, Kiowa, Greer, Harmon, and Jackson.    

Some of the principal cities in the district include Guymon, Ponca City, Cheyenne, Enid, Stillwater, Yukon, Guthrie, Sapulpa and Altus.  It also includes slivers of Oklahoma City and Tulsa.

Demographics
Unlike the previous 3rd congressional district, a largely rural area, today half of the district's inhabitants are classified as urban, and 3 percent of adults working in the district use public transportation, ride a bike, or walk. The district's population is 5 percent Latino and 3 percent foreign-born.

Results from recent statewide elections

Politics
The political success of the Republican party in the region reflects changing patterns of party affiliation similar to changes across the South. Although northwest Oklahoma was settled by migrants from Kansas, who favored the Republican Party and the Union during the Civil War, the southeast was settled by conservative white Southerners. For decades they were affiliated with the United States Democratic Party and traditions of that region.

The Great Depression hurt the GOP. Since the late 20th century, party affiliations have changed, and today most white conservatives belong to the Republican Party here. It is now one of the most Republican districts in the nation. George W. Bush received 72 percent of the district's presidential vote in 2004.

As of 2022, the district is represented by Republican Frank Lucas.

List of members representing the district

Recent election results

2012

2014

2016

2018

2020

2022

Historical district boundaries

See also

Oklahoma's congressional districts
List of United States congressional districts

References

Congressional Biographical Directory of the United States 1774–present

03